The Droke is a settlement located within the town of Burin, south of Marystown, Newfoundland and Labrador.

See also
List of communities in Newfoundland and Labrador

Populated coastal places in Canada
Populated places in Newfoundland and Labrador